Menathais bimaculata is a species of sea snail, a marine gastropod mollusk, in the family Muricidae, the murex snails or rock snails.

References

 Claremont, M., Vermeij, G. J., Williams, S. T. & Reid, D. G. (2013). Global phylogeny and new classification of the Rapaninae (Gastropoda: Muricidae), dominant molluscan predators on tropical rocky seashores. Molecular Phylogenetics and Evolution. 66: 91–102.

External links
 Jonas, J. H. (1845). Neue Conchylien. Zeitschrift für Malakozoologie. 2: 168-173

bimaculata
Gastropods described in 1845